Dorothy Eugenia Rogers Tilly (June 30, 1883 – March 16, 1970) was an American civil rights activist from the progressive era until her death. She was a noted activist in the Women's Missionary Society (WMS), Commission on Interracial Cooperation (CIC), Association of Southern Women for the Prevention of Lynching, Southern Regional Council, Fulton-DeKalb Commission on Interracial Cooperation, and Fellowship of the Concerned (FOC). She was also appointed to the President's Committee on Civil Rights in 1946 by Harry S. Truman.

Tilly was a member of Phi Mu fraternity and also an honorary member of Delta Sigma Theta.

Bibliography
 Feldman, Glenn. "'City Mothers' Dorothy Tilly, Georgia Methodist Women, and Black Civil Rights". Politics and Religion in the White South. University Press of Kentucky, 2005. .
Houck, Davis W. and David E. Dixon. "Dorothy Tilly". Women and the Civil Rights Movement, 1954-1965. Univ. Press of Mississippi, 2009. .
 Riehm, Edith Holbrook. "Dorothy Tilly and the Fellowship of the Concerned". Throwing Off the Cloak of Privilege: White Southern Women Activists in the Civil Rights Era. Ed. Gail S. Murray. Gainesville: University Press of Florida, 2004. .
Stuart A. Rose Manuscript, Archives, and Rare Book Library, Emory University: Dorothy Rogers Tilly papers, 1868-1970

References

External links
 Dorothy Rogers Tilly papers held at Emory University

1883 births
1970 deaths
American civil rights activists